Gualtiero Tumiati ( 8 May 1876 – 23 April 1971) was an Italian actor and stage director.

Life and career 
Born in Ferrara, Tumiati studied at the College of the Oaks in Florence and there he attended the acting courses held by Luigi Rasi. He later graduated in law and while working as an apprentice lawyer at his father's law firm he started performing in some local stage companies. Tumiati's breakout role was Cyrano de Bergerac in a critically acclaimed representation of the Edmond Rostand's eponymous play held in 1910. With his wife, the actress and painter Beryl Hight, in 1928 Tumiati founded the "Sala Azzurra" ("Blue Room"), one of the first Avant-garde theaters in Italy. He taught acting at the Accademia d'Arte Drammatica in Rome and at the Accademia dei filodrammatici in Milan. Gone blind, his last role was in the blind Tiresias in a representation of Sophocles' Oedipus Rex held in 1969 in the La Scala theatre.

Filmography

References

External links 

1876 births
1971 deaths
Actors from Ferrara
Italian male stage actors
Italian male film actors
Blind artists
Italian theatre directors
20th-century Italian male actors